David Kyle Logan (born December 26, 1982) is an American–born naturalized Polish professional basketball player for Scafati Basket of the Lega Basket Serie A (LBA).

High school and college career
Logan attended North Central High School in Indianapolis, Indiana.

Logan led the US college basketball in scoring averaging 28.6 points per game in his senior year at the University of Indianapolis. His performances earned him the NCAA II Player of the Year Award. He finished his collegiate career as the all-time leading scorer in Indianapolis with 2,352 points.

Professional career
Logan signed for the 2005–06 season with the Italian second division club Pallacanestro Pavia. In December 2005 he moved to Israel and signed with Hapoel MB9 Ramat Hasharon, playing under Miki Berkowitz. Logan averaged 15.4 points in 22 games.

After that he went back to the US and played seven games for the Fort Worth Flyers in the NBDL. He finished the 2006–07 season playing for SKS Starogard in Poland.

In the 2007–08 season, Logan signed with Turow Zgorzelec and took part in the EuroCup, where he averaged 18.6 points per game and reached the Final Eight. His play was rewarded by a transfer to Polish powerhouse Asseco Prokom and a participation in the EuroLeague. He contributed a lot to his team's sixth straight national championship Asseco Prokom .

On July 2, 2010 he signed a contract with Spanish powerhouse Caja Laboral.

In August 2011 he signed a two-year deal with Panathinaikos in Greece.

In July 2012 he signed a two-year deal with Maccabi Tel Aviv of the Israeli Super League. In July 2013, he left the team and became a free agent.

In July 2013 he signed a one-year deal with the German EuroCup club, Alba Berlin.

On July 5, 2014, he signed with Italian team Dinamo Banco di Sardegna Sassari, also playing in the European top-tier EuroLeague.
The next year, his contract was extended for another year.

On July 22, 2016, Logan signed with Lithuanian team Lietuvos rytas Vilnius.

On February 16, 2017, Sidigas Avellino confirmed that team bought Logan from Lietuvos rytas and signed a contract until the end of the season.

On July 22, 2017, Logan signed with French club Strasbourg IG.

On February 9, 2019, Logan signed a deal with De' Longhi Treviso in the Italian Serie A2. In the same year, Treviso achieved the promotion to LBA as the A2 Playoff winners. David Logan was named MVP of the Playoff Finals.

On July 12, 2021, Logan returned to Sassari for the season 2021-2022.

On October 13, 2022, he signed with Scafati Basket of the Lega Basket Serie A (LBA).

International career
In late February 2009, Logan became a Polish citizen, the same summer he played with Poland at EuroBasket 2009. He averaged 15.5 Points and 4.5 assists per game at the tournament.

Career statistics

EuroLeague

|-
| style="text-align:left;"| 2008–09
| style="text-align:left;"| Asseco Prokom
| 15 || 15 || 34.3 || .402 || .337 || .786 || 2.7 || 2.7 || style="background:#CFECEC;"| 2.7 || .3 || 16.9 || 13.5
|-
| style="text-align:left;"| 2009–10
| style="text-align:left;"| Asseco Prokom
| 20 || 20 || 36.3 || .453 || .331 || .625 || 2.6 || 3.4 || 1.6 || .2 || 15.3 || 13.1
|-
| style="text-align:left;"| 2010–11
| style="text-align:left;"| Caja Laboral
| 19 || 11 || 22.9 || .415 || .398 || .735 || 1.6 || 2.4 || .8 || .1 || 10.0 || 8.6
|-
| style="text-align:left;"| 2011–12
| style="text-align:left;"| Panathinaikos
| 21 || 5 || 15.0 || .437 || .317 || .706 || .9 || 1.0 || 1.0 || .1 || 6.5 || 4.7
|-
| style="text-align:left;"| 2012–13
| style="text-align:left;"| Maccabi Tel Aviv
| 27 || 0 || 24.9 || .493 || .434 || .640 || 2.3 || 1.2 || 1.1 || .3 || 10.6 || 10.0
|-
| style="text-align:left;"| 2013–14
| style="text-align:left;"| Maccabi Tel Aviv
| 27 || 0 || 24.9 || .493 || .434 || .640 || 2.3 || 1.2 || 1.1 || .3 || 10.6 || 10.0
|-
| style="text-align:left;"| 2014–15
| style="text-align:left;"| Sassari
| 10 || 9 || 29.1 || .373 || .333 || .692 || 2.1 || 2.8 || 2.3 || .0 || 11.9 || 8.5
|-
| style="text-align:left;"| 2015–16
| style="text-align:left;"| Sassari
| 8 || 8 || 27.3 || .432 || .296 || .846 || 1.3 || 2.9 || 2.0 || .1 || 11.4 || 7.9
|- class="sortbottom"
| style="text-align:left;"| Career
| style="text-align:left;"|
| 120 || 68 || ? || .490 || .360 || .705 || 2.0 || 2.2 || 1.5 || .2 || 11.5 || ?

Awards and accomplishments

Individual
 De' Longhi Treviso
Italian Serie A2 Playoff MVP (1): 2019
 Turów Zgorzelec
PLK Most Valuable Player (1): 2007–08
 Dinamo Sassari
Italian Cup MVP (1): 2015
 Indianapolis (College)
 NCAA II Player of the Year (1): 2005

Club
 Asseco Prokom
Polish Basketball League (2): 2008–09, 2009–10
 Panathinaikos B.C.
 Greek Cup (1): 2011–12
 Maccabi Tel Aviv
 Israeli State Cup (1): 2012–13
 Dinamo Sassari
Italian Cup (1): 2015
Italian Super Cup (1): 2014
Serie A Championship (1): 2014–15
 De' Longhi Treviso
Serie A2 Championship (1): 2018–19

References

External links
Euroleague.net Profile
NBA.com Profile

1982 births
Living people
Alba Berlin players
American emigrants to Poland
American expatriate basketball people in France
American expatriate basketball people in Germany
American expatriate basketball people in Greece
American expatriate basketball people in Israel
American expatriate basketball people in Italy
American expatriate basketball people in Lithuania
American expatriate basketball people in Poland
American expatriate basketball people in South Korea
American expatriate basketball people in Spain
American men's basketball players
Asseco Gdynia players
Basketball players from Chicago
Basketball players from Indiana
BC Rytas players
Dinamo Sassari players
Fort Worth Flyers players
Indianapolis Greyhounds men's basketball players
Lega Basket Serie A players
Liga ACB players
Maccabi Tel Aviv B.C. players
Naturalized citizens of Poland
Pallacanestro Pavia players
Panathinaikos B.C. players
Point guards
Polish expatriate basketball people in France
Polish expatriate basketball people in Germany
Polish expatriate basketball people in Greece
Polish expatriate basketball people in Italy
Polish expatriate basketball people in Spain
Polish expatriate basketball people in the United States
Polish expatriate sportspeople in Israel
Polish expatriate sportspeople in Lithuania
Polish expatriates in South Korea
Polish men's basketball players
S.S. Felice Scandone players
Saski Baskonia players
Scafati Basket players
SIG Basket players
Suwon KT Sonicboom players
Turów Zgorzelec players
Universo Treviso Basket players